Cowboys is a British television sitcom that aired on the ITV network during the early 1980s. The title refers to the British colloquial use of "cowboy" to describe a workman of doubtful professionalism e.g. a "cowboy builder".

Overview
Roy Kinnear starred as Joe Jones, the hapless owner of a small building firm. His inept employees include 'Wobbly' Ron (David Kelly), Geyser (Colin Welland) and Eric (James Wardroper). Debbie Linden appeared in Series 1 as Doreen, with Janine Duvitski taking over as Muriel in Series 2.

The show was created by Peter Learmouth who would go on to create Granada television sitcoms Surgical Spirit and Let Them Eat Cake.

Cast 
 Roy Kinnear – Joe Jones
 David Kelly – Wobbly Ron
 Colin Welland – Geyser
 James Wardroper – Eric
 Debbie Linden – Doreen (series 1)
 Janine Duvitski – Muriel (series 2)

Episodes

Series One (1980)
1.1. Ripping Out
1.2. Perks
1.3. Remember Honky Stubbs
1.4. Black Day at Bad Rock
1.5. C.L.O.D.
1.6. Two Right Casanovas

Series Two (1980-1981)
2.1. Was It Eddie Croucher?
2.2. On Top of Old Smokey
2.3. Bell, Book and Candle
2.4. Hurricane Lesley
2.5. Pieces of Hate
2.6. Operation Douche
2.7. Middle for Diddle

DVD releases

See also
 The Gaffer

External links
 
 

1980 British television series debuts
1981 British television series endings
1980s British sitcoms
ITV sitcoms
Television shows produced by Thames Television
Television series by Fremantle (company)
English-language television shows